Vijaygarh Fort (Hindi :विजयगढ़ किला) is a ruined fort located 30 km from Robertsganj in south east direction  in Mau Kalan village in Chatra block near Dhandhraul Dam on Chatra-Siltham road , in Robertsganj in the Sonbhadra district, Uttar Pradesh India.

History
Last ruler of Vijaygarh Fort was Raja Chait Singh of Benares. He ruled until British reached this point. The fort is considered to be mesmeric and another fort is said to be hidden under it. Near the main gateway of the fort there is a tomb, which is said to be that of Saiyyed Jain-ul-Abdin Meer Sahib popularly known as Hazrat Meeran Shah Baba. There are two tanks known as Mira Sagar and Ram Sagar near the tomb which are never dry.

Attractions
Vijaygarh Fort contains several old temples and red stone pillars bearing inscriptions of Vishnuverdhan feudatory of Samudragupta. The fort is famous for its rock inscriptions, cave paintings, many statues and its perennial ponds. There are four ponds inside the premises of the fort which never dry. More than half the area of Vijargarh is covered by the steep and rugged hills of the Kaimur Range. Between the two tanks there was a palace known as Rang Mahal (Hindi:रंग महल) which had artistic rock carvings and assumed as palace of Princess Chandrakanta. 

There is a fair (Urs) organized every April, and people from different religions and sects attend.

Vijaygarh fort has both historical and archaeological importance. The fort and Princess Chandrakanta were pertinently described in the novel Chandrakanta by Devaki Nandan Khatri 

In the Hindu month of Shravana, Kānvarias (Kanwar Yatra) collect water from Ram Sagar and then start their holy journey to the Shivdwar.

Gallery

See also
 List of forts in Uttar Pradesh

References

http:sonbhadra.nic.in/PrincesChandrakanta.aspx
 Chandrakanta by Devaki Nandan Khatri

Buildings and structures in Sonbhadra district
Forts in Uttar Pradesh
Tourist attractions in Sonbhadra district